Rth or RTH may refer to:

Business 
 Regular trading hours
 ICAO symbol for Artis (airline)
 Exchange symbol for VanEck Vectors Retail, an exchange-traded fund

Media 
 Radio y Televisión de Hidalgo, Mexico

Other uses 
 Equivalent resistance (Rth) in Thévenin's theorem
 Resistance to Thyroid Hormone
 Book of Ruth
 Rotterdam The Hague Airport
 Rhyncattleanthe  (Rth.), an orchid nothogenus